The Mount Cooper striped lerista (Lerista vittata), also known as side-striped fine-lined slider or Mount Cooper striped skink, is a species of skink in the family Scincidae.
It is found only in Australia.

References

Skinks of Australia
Taxonomy articles created by Polbot
Reptiles described in 1983
Lerista
Taxa named by Allen Eddy Greer
Taxa named by Keith R. McDonald (herpetologist)
Taxa named by Bruce C. Lawrie